"Coco" is a song by French singer, Wejdene, released on 19 August 2020 from her debut album 16.

Charts

Weekly charts

Year-end charts

References

2020 songs
2020 singles
French songs